QCA may refer to:
 Qualifications and Curriculum Authority, formerly an executive non-departmental public body (NDPB) of the Department for Education in the United Kingdom
 Qualitative comparative analysis, a technique for solving the problems that are caused by making causal inferences on the basis of only a small number of cases
 Quantum cellular automata, any one of several models of quantum computation
 Queensland College of Art, a specialist arts and design college located in South Bank, Brisbane, and Southport, Gold Coast Australia
 Queensland Cricket Association
 Quezon City Academy, a Secondary school in Quezon City, Philippines
 Quoted Companies Alliance, a not-for profit organisation representing small businesses
 Quad Cities Area, is a geographic region of the Mid-Mississippi Valley of the United States that includes several communities in the states of Iowa and Illinois.
 Quantum dot cellular automaton
 QCA, IATA code of Mecca, Saudi Arabia's airport